Redford is a suburb of Edinburgh, the capital of Scotland. It is in the south-west of the city, south-east of the Colinton area, and is known particularly for Redford Barracks, an army base.

External links

 Google Maps

Areas of Edinburgh